Tiwi can refer to:

Tiwi, Albay, a municipality in the province of Albay, Philippines
Tiwi, Kenya, a settlement in Kenya's Coast Province
Tiwi, Oman, an archaeological site
Tiwi, Northern Territory, a suburb of Darwin in Australia
The Tiwi people, the inhabitants of the Tiwi Islands
The Tiwi language, spoken by the Tiwi people

See also
 Tawi (disambiguation)
 Tivi (disambiguation)